Christopher "Chris" Silber (born October 6, 1973) is an American television writer and producer. He is also the showrunner of NCIS: New Orleans.

Silber was previously a producer and a writer for NCIS, Cold Case, CSI: NY, and Elementary. He currently co-showruns NCIS: Hawaii which he co-created.

Filmography

References

External links
 

Living people
1973 births
Showrunners